Paul Adams may refer to:

Academics
 Paul L. Adams (academic) (1915–1984), president of Roberts Wesleyan College and candidate for Governor of New York
 Paul Adams (scientist), British professor of neurobiology at Stony Brook University
 Paul C. Adams, professor of geography at University of Texas at Austin

Politics
 Paul Adams (Massachusetts politician), Massachusetts politician
 Paul Adams (New Zealand politician) (born 1947/48), rally driver and former politician from New Zealand

Sports
 Paul Adams (American football coach) (1936–2019), American football player and Hall of Fame high school coach
 Paul Adams (center) (1919–1995), American football player and coach
 Paul Adams (cricketer) (born 1977), South African cricketer
 Paul Adams (coach) (1921–1986), American football, cross country running, and track and field coach
 Paul Adams (sport shooter) (born 1992), Australian sport shooter
 Paul Adams (umpire) (born 1949), English cricket umpire

Other
 Paul Adams (journalist) (born 1961), English BBC television news correspondent
 Paul Adams (musician) (born 1951), musician, writer, and musical instrument builder
 Paul Adams (property developer) (born 1948/1949), New Zealand businessman and philanthropist
 Paul D. Adams (1906–1987), U.S. Army general
 Paul L. Adams (Michigan judge) (1908–1990), member of the Michigan Supreme Court
 Paul Adams (pilot) (1922–2013), World War II pilot with the Tuskegee Airmen

See also
 Adams (surname)
 Paul Adam (disambiguation)